Mighty Joe Young may refer to:

Mighty Joe Young (1949 film)
Mighty Joe Young (1998 film)
Mighty Joe Young (musician), blues musician
the original name for Stone Temple Pilots, who recorded the Mighty Joe Young Demo before changing their name